Steven M. Rosen (born September 6, 1942) is an American-Canadian philosopher and psychologist, currently based in Vancouver, British Columbia. His writings focus on issues concerning phenomenological ontology, the philosophy and poetics of science, Jungian thought, the gender question, ecological change, and cultural transformation.

Rosen's books include Dreams, Death, Rebirth (Asheville, NC: Chiron Publications, 2014), The Self-Evolving Cosmos (Hackensack, NJ: World Scientific Publishing, 2008), Topologies of the Flesh (Athens, Ohio: Ohio University Press, 2006), Dimensions of Apeiron (Amsterdam-New York: Editions Rodopi, 2004), Science, Paradox, and the Moebius Principle (Albany, N.Y.: State University of New York Press, 1994) and The Moebius Seed (Walpole, N.H.: Stillpoint Publications, 1985).

Steven M. Rosen taught psychology and philosophy at the College of Staten Island of the City University of New York from 1970 to 2000.

External links
 Embodying Cyberspace
 Dreams, Death, Rebirth
 The Self-Evolving Cosmos
 Topologies of the Flesh
 Dimensions of Apeiron
 Science, Paradox, and the Moebius Principle

1942 births
Living people
20th-century American philosophers
21st-century American philosophers
21st-century American psychologists
Scientists from Vancouver
College of Staten Island faculty
20th-century American psychologists